Satyrus effendi is a butterfly of the family Nymphalidae. It is found in the southern Zangezur Mountains (including both the Armenian and Nakhichivan sides). It inhabits sub-alpine grasslands, occupying stony slopes on 2500–3000 meters above sea level. The flight period is from mid-July to mid-August. The range of Satyrus effendi is covered by the Lichk Prime Butterfly Area, that is included in the Zangezur Biosphere Complex.

In Media
The butterfly was featured in an episode of National Geographic's podcast Overheard at National Geographic, in which photographer Rena Effendi discusses how it was named for her father, a lepidopterist from Soviet Azerbaijan, as well as the difficulty in finding live specimens due to it being located entirely on the hostile border between warring Armenia and Azerbaijan.

References

Butterflies described in 1989
Satyrini